Wambool is a locality in the Bathurst Region, New South Wales, Australia.

Heritage 
Wambool has heritage sites, including:

 Main Western railway line: Wambool old-rail truss overbridges

References 

Bathurst Region
Localities in New South Wales